Aphaenogaster bidentatus is a species of ant in the family Formicidae. It is endemic to the United States.

This is not a currently recognized taxon.

References

bidentatus
Hymenoptera of North America
Insects of the United States
Taxonomy articles created by Polbot